The fall of Mogadishu occurred on December 28, 2006, when the militaries of Somalia's Transitional Federal Government (TFG) and Ethiopian troops entered the Somali capital unopposed. It came after a swift string of TFG and Ethiopian military victories against the Islamic Courts Union (ICU), which had its headquarters in Mogadishu before it fled south.

Background

The ICU was confined to the capital city of Mogadishu after a series of successive losses at the battles of Baidoa, Bandiradley, Beledweyne, and finally Jowhar.

Somalia's envoy to Ethiopia confirmed Ethiopian-backed Somali government troops would lay siege to Mogadishu until it surrenders, rather than assault the city. "We are not going to fight for Mogadishu to avoid civilian casualties…  Our troops will surround Mogadishu until they surrender," he told reporters in Addis Ababa.

ICU troops abandoned their barracks in the town of Balad, the last town before the outskirts of Mogadishu.  Ethiopian and Somali government forces, accompanied by patrolling Ethiopian jets, approached within 30 km (18 mi) of the city.

Clan leaders in Mogadishu were considering whether to back the government troops advancing on the capital. This would preempt a possible lengthy and bloody fight for the capital and deal a devastating blow to the Islamic Courts.  Islamic fighters were seen changing out of their uniforms and into civilian clothing while women were spotted on the streets selling the stimulant khat which was banned by the Islamists.

Areas in the north of Mogadishu were reported to be overtaken by clan militias who rapidly switched allegiances and reversed the policies of the ICU, allowing khat to be sold openly, and for cinemas to reopen. ICU troops were reported in hiding and there was speculation in the capital that Kismayo would fall soon.

Resignation of ICU Leaders
As fighting neared Mogadishu, the Islamists turned over their weapons to the clans in the capital and the Hawiye, one of Somalia's largest clans, began discussing a peaceful resolution with the interim government. The stability created by the Islamic militias also began to collapse with people returning to their homes and bandits once again roaming the streets.  Fighting began early on the 27th in Yaqshid, a district in northern Mogadishu, as clan militias attempted to raid an arms warehouse.  The clan militias, who had been disarmed by the ICU, appeared to be attempting to rearm in preparation for the return of the warlords associated with the government.  Abdirahman Dinari, spokesperson for the TFG, stated that these were a minority of militias and that they would be "dealt with" once they had taken control of the city. Most businesses had closed by the 28th, as proprietors waited for developments.

The top leaders of the ICU, including Sheikh Hassan Dahir Aweys, Sheikh Sharif Sheikh Ahmed and Sheikh Abdirahman Janaqow, resigned in anticipation of the siege. Their official press release called upon ICU fighters to secure the areas in which they were stationed and expressed their regret that foreign powers had invaded the country and that Somalia would return to chaos.

Government takes control
On December 28, TFG spokesman Abdirahman Dinari cautiously expressed, "We are taking control of the city and I will confirm when we have established complete control… Our forces already effectively control Mogadishu because we have taken over the two control points on the main roads outside the city… Within two to three hours we will capture the whole city." He also added that the government was in control of 95% of the country, but a state of emergency would be imposed to bring law and order back to the country. An ebullient Member of Parliament, Mohamed Jama Fuurah, called Reuters from the port of Mogadishu saying, "The government has taken over Mogadishu. We are now in charge." Pro-government militias were said to have control of key locations, including the former presidential palace.

Ali Ghedi, the Prime Minister of the transitional government, stated that Somali government troops had entered Mogadishu without resistance, as well as the town of Afgoye on its outskirts. Mohamed Jama Furuh, a member of parliament and former warlord, took control of Mogadishu's seaport on the government's behalf, an area he had controlled before the rise of the ICU as a warlord. The President, Abdullahi Yusuf, asserted that TFG troops were not a threat to the city-dwellers, though there were some reports of gunfire in the city.

On December 29, Ghedi entered the city after consultations with clan leaders on the outskirts. He was received by cheering crowds and anti-Ethiopian protests.

Roughly 3,000 ICU fighters fled towards the port city of Kismayo, their last remaining stronghold, 300 miles (500 km) to the south. In Kismayo, executive leader of the ICU, Sharif Sheikh Ahmed was defiant, "We will not run away from our enemies. We will never depart from Somalia. We will stay in our homeland."

Aftermath
On December 31, in Mogadishu a missile aimed at Ethiopian troops slammed into a residential area reportedly killing one woman and injuring a man and their daughter. Also, an explosion occurred around 9pm local time at the Hotel Ramadan in Yaaqshiid district, former headquarters of the ICU. Two people were injured. It was speculated that the target might have been Ethiopian troops who had taken over control of the hotel.

See also
Somali Civil War
Battle of Mogadishu (1993)
Battle of Mogadishu (2006)
Battle of Mogadishu (March–April 2007)
Battle of Mogadishu (November 2007)
Battle of Mogadishu (2008)
Battle of South Mogadishu (2009)
Battle of Mogadishu (2009)
Battle of Mogadishu (2010–11)

References

Mogadishu
2006 in Ethiopia
2006 in Somalia
Mogadishu
Mogadishu
21st century in Mogadishu
December 2006 events in Africa